Circle High School is a public high school in Towanda, Kansas. The school mascot is the Thunderbird. The school is located at 905 Main Street. According to US News the school has an enrollment of 523 students and  36 full-time teachers. Circle High has a 95 percent graduation rate and 12 percent minority enrollment.

See also

 Education in the United States

References

Schools in Butler County, Kansas
Public high schools in Kansas